Vugar Shirinli (born 14 September 1992) is an Azerbaijani Paralympic judoka. He won the gold medal in the men's 60 kg event at the 2020 Summer Paralympics held in Tokyo, Japan.

Before competing in Paralympic judo, he won the gold medal in the men's 60 kg event at the 2017 Judo Grand Prix Tashkent held in Tashkent, Uzbekistan.

References

External links

 

Living people
1992 births
Azerbaijani male judoka
Paralympic judoka of Azerbaijan
Paralympic gold medalists for Azerbaijan
Paralympic medalists in judo
Judoka at the 2020 Summer Paralympics
Medalists at the 2020 Summer Paralympics
Place of birth missing (living people)
21st-century Azerbaijani people